This is a list of Ukrainian, Russian and Russian-separatist aircraft losses. It covers helicopters, fixed-wing aircraft and UAVs, during the Russo-Ukrainian War, including the war in Donbas and the 2022 Russian invasion of Ukraine.

Donbas war
During the Donbas war, on 20 November 2014, Ukrainian sources reported at a conference in London that the total Ukrainian aerial losses during the conflict in the east were: one Su-24, six Su-25s, two MiG-29s, one An-26, one An-30 and one Il-76. Helicopter losses amounted to seven Mi-8/17s and five Mi-24s.

Ukrainian aircraft losses

Fixed-wing aircraft
 Ukrainian Air Force – 6 June 2014: An Antonov An-30 surveillance plane was shot down by separatist militias from Sloviansk with two shoulder-launched missiles. Ukrainian authorities initially claimed that the pilots survived, but they later reported that five crewmembers were killed in the action, and two others missing.
 Ukrainian Air Force – 14 June 2014: An Ilyushin Il-76 transport plane was shot down as it approached an airport in Luhansk, killing nine crew members and 40 troops on board.
 Ukrainian Air Force – Claim – 14 June 2014: Rebels claim to have shot down a Sukhoi Su-24 with a portable anti-aircraft gun after it had dropped cluster munitions on a local police station. They also claimed that they had captured the pilot after he bailed out.
 Ukrainian Air Force – Claim – 19 June 2014: A spokesman for the militia in Donetsk stated that they downed a Ukrainian Sukhoi Su-25 during fighting in Yampil.
 Ukrainian Air Force – 2 July 2014: A Ukrainian Sukhoi Su-25, call sign Blue 06, crashed due to a technical fault while landing at Dnipropetrovsk International Airport. The pilot ejected safely.
The Ukrainian defence minister claimed that the altitude is far from the reach of a shoulder-launched missile, suggesting that the aircraft was downed by Russian forces. Two crewmembers were captured by pro-Russian militiamen, four were rescued by Ukrainian forces and the other two were unaccounted for. The missing aviators were found dead on 17 July.
 Ukrainian Air Force – 16 July 2014: A Ukrainian Su-25, call sign Blue 03, was shot down over eastern Ukraine near Amvrosiivka town, and the pilot ejected successfully. National Security Council spokesman Andriy Lysenko said that it was shot down by a missile fired from a Russian Mikoyan MiG-29.
 (2) Ukrainian Air Force – 23 July 2014: Two Su-25s, call signs Blue 04 and Blue 33, were shot down in the rebel-held area of Savur-Mohyla. Ukrainian authorities claimed that they were hit by long-range anti-aircraft missiles launched from Russia. Ukrainian Prime Minister Arseniy Yatsenyuk said in an interview that one of the attack planes was probably shot down by an air-to-air missile.
 Ukrainian Air Force – 7 August 2014: Pro-Russian forces shot down a Ukrainian Air Force Mikoyan MiG-29 with a Buk missile near the town of Yenakievo. The pilot managed to eject. and separatist sources later claimed he was captured and interrogated.
 Ukrainian Air Force – 17 August 2014: A Mikoyan MiG-29 was shot down by rebels in the Luhansk region of eastern Ukraine returning after completing a successful mission. The pilot managed to eject and was found by a search and rescue operation.
 Ukrainian Air Force – 20 August 2014: A Sukhoi Su-24M was shot down by rebel forces in Luhansk Oblast. The two crewmembers ejected successfully.
 Ukrainian Air Force – 29 August 2014: A Sukhoi Su-25, call sign Blue 08, was shot down near Starobeshevo by a surface-to-air missile during the battle of Ilovaisk. The pilot, Captain Vladyslav Voloshyn, ejected and after 4 days was able to reach Ukrainian-controlled territory, was secured by a unit of the Ukrainian National Guard.

Rotary-wing aircraft
 Ukrainian Air Force – 25 April 2014: A Mil Mi-8MT, call sign Yellow 55, was destroyed after being struck by small arms fire on the fuel tanks when it was being prepared for departure in Kramatorsk airport.
 (2) Ukrainian Army Aviation – 2 May 2014: Two Mil Mi-24 helicopters were shot down during large-scale operations during the Siege of Sloviansk. Rebels claimed they had taken one of the pilots captive. The Ukrainian Ministry of Internal Affairs reported that two helicopters had been shot down, resulting in the deaths of two airmen.
 Ukrainian Army Aviation – 5 May 2014: A Mil Mi-24 crashed after it was shot down by a heavy machine gun operated by rebel forces. The damaged helicopter landed in a river, and all crew members survived. Later, it was destroyed by an airstrike.
 Ukrainian Army Aviation – 29 May 2014: A Mil Mi-8 helicopter was shot down by rebel forces between Kramatorsk and Mount Karachun, killing 14 on board, among them General Serhiy Kulchytsky. Another soldier was seriously injured but survived the crash.
 Ukrainian Air Force – 4 June 2014: Two Mil Mi-24 helicopters were forced to land by rebel fire, however one of the helicopters was burned out by the damage and could not be repaired.
 Ukrainian Air Force – 21 June 2014: A Ukrainian Mil Mi-8 crashed while delivering military hardware near Chuhuiv.
 Ukrainian Air Force – 24 June 2014: The Ukrainian military said that one of its helicopters, a Mil Mi-8, had been shot down by pro-Russian rebels in the east near Sloviansk, killing all nine people on board.
 Ukrainian Air Force – 7 August 2014: Pro-Russian forces shot down a Ukrainian Mi-8MT, call sign Yellow 62, in Manuilivka, Donetsk Oblast.
 Ukrainian Air Force – 17 August 2014: A Mil Mi-8 was shot down near the village of Heorhiivka, Luhansk Oblast.
 Ukrainian Army Aviation – 20 August 2014: A Mil Mi-24 helicopter was shot down in near the town of Horlivka according to the Ukrainian Ministry of Defence. Both pilots died in the attack.
 Ukrainian Air Force – 27 August 2014: A Mil Mi-8, call sign Yellow 59, crashed while landing in Olenivka, Donetsk Oblast.

Russian aircraft losses
  Russian forces – August 2014: A Forpost drone was shot down in eastern Ukraine.
  Russian forces – October 2014: A Forpost drone was lost in eastern Ukraine.
  Russian forces – May 2015: A Forpost drone was shot down by Ukrainian Dnipro-1 Battalion in Pesky, Ukraine.
  Russian forces – October 2016: A Forpost drone was lost in eastern Ukraine.
  Russian forces – October 2016: A Forpost drone was lost in eastern Ukraine.

Total losses 
The following table is made from the data reported in the article.

2022 Russian invasion of Ukraine

Losses during the 2022 Russian invasion of Ukraine

Ukrainian aircraft losses

Fixed-wing aircraft

Rotary-wing aircraft

Unmanned aerial vehicles
 Ukrainian Ground Forces – 8 March 2022: A complete Leleka-100 kit with serial number 258 was captured by Russian forces.
 Ukrainian Air Force – 8 March 2022: A Tu-141 reconnaissance drone was reported crashed in Ukraine. Ukraine is the only known operator of the drone.
 Ukrainian Naval Aviation – 9 March 2022: A Ukrainian Bayraktar TB2, tail numberT223, was lost under unknown circumstances in Crimea. Images surfaced on 18 February 2023.
 Ukrainian Air Force – 11 March 2022: One Tu-141 reconnaissance drone crashed in front of a student campus in Zagreb, Croatia. The Croatian president, Zoran Milanović, said it was clear the drone came from the direction of Ukraine, entering Croatia after flying over Hungary. The investigation conducted by the Ministry of Defence of Croatia concluded that the crashed drone had belonged to the Armed Forces of Ukraine and carried a bomb meant for striking Russian positions but it had strayed off course and crashed after it ran out of fuel.
 Ukrainian Air Force – 13 March 2022: One Tu-141 reconnaissance drone was shot down by Russian forces in Crimea.
 Ukrainian Air Force – 17 March 2022: A Bayraktar TB2 was shot down over Kyiv; the Russian Ministry of Defense published images of the drone wreckage.
 Ukrainian Air Force – 20 March 2022: A Ukrainian A1-SM Furia reconnaissance drone was shot down.
 Ukrainian Air Force – 29 March 2022: A second Bayraktar TB2 was shot down, likely in eastern Ukraine.
 Ukrainian Air Force – 29 March 2022: A A1-SM Furia drone was shot down by Russian forces in Chernihiv, Ukraine.
 Ukrainian Air Force – 30 March 2022: A UJ-22 Airborne drone was reported shot down by Russian Pantsir S1 air defenses.
 Ukrainian Air Force – 2 April 2022: A Bayraktar TB2 was lost in Kherson.
 Ukrainian Air Force – 12 April 2022: One Tu-143 drone was lost over Kharkiv, shot down by Russian forces.
 Ukrainian Air Force – 12 April 2022: One Leleka-100 reconnaissance drone was shot down by Russian Naval Intelligence forces.
 Ukrainian Air Force – 13 April 2022: The remains of a Ukrainian A1-SM Furia reconnaissance drone were recorded by Russian troops in Azovstal, Mariupol.
 Ukrainian Air Force – 25 April 2022: A Ukrainian Bayraktar TB2, registration number S49T, was shot down in Kursk Oblast, Russia, after allegedly attacking a Russian base. The drone was destroyed on its way back to his base.
 (2) Ukrainian Air Force – 27 April 2022: Two Bayraktar TB2 drones were reported shot down in Russia: one in Belgorod and another in Kursk. By 28 April 2022, Russian forces had successfully destroyed six Bayraktar TB2 drones as confirmed by imagery.
 Ukrainian Air Force – 28 April 2022: One Tu-141 reconnaissance drone was shot down during an attack on Russian controlled Kherson.
 Ukrainian Air Force – 30 April 2022: One Tu-143 drone was shot down over Bryansk, Russia, by Russian forces.
 Ukrainian Air Force – 1 May 2022: A Ukrainian Bayraktar TB2, registration number S51T was shot down in Kursk region, Russia, bringing confirmed losses of TB2 drones to a total of 7.
 Ukrainian Air Force – 6 May 2022: A Ukrainian Spaitech Sparrow drone was shot down in Ukraine.
 Ukrainian Air Force – 2 May 2022: A Ukrainian A1-SM Furia reconnaissance drone was shot down in Lyman.
 Ukrainian Air Force – 10 May 2022: One Tu-143 drone was recorded crashed in Ukraine.
 Ukrainian Air Force – 13 May 2022: A Ukrainian A1-SM Furia reconnaissance drone was shot down in Kharkiv Oblast.
 Ukrainian Air Force – 14 May 2022: Another Ukrainian A1-SM Furia reconnaissance drone was shot down in Kharkiv Oblast.
 Ukrainian Air Force – 18 May 2022: A Ukrainian A1-SM Furia reconnaissance drone was shot down.
 Ukrainian Air Force – 20 May 2022: A Ukrainian Bayraktar TB2 drone with tail number T274 was reported shot down in Vuhledar, Donetsk Oblast, by Russian air defenses.
 Ukrainian Naval Aviation – 23 May 2022: The remains of a Ukrainian Bayraktar TB2, tail number 75, was recovered from Romanian territorial waters by Romanian Naval Forces. The wreckage was first discovered on 11 May 2022 about two nautical miles of Sulina. The drone was likely shot down during the Snake Island attacks conducted by Ukraine in the first week of May 2022.
 Ukrainian Air Force – 23 May 2022: A Ukrainian Tupolev Tu-143 drone was shot down by Russian air defenses in Rostov, Russia.
 Ukrainian Air Force – 30 May 2022: A Ukrainian A1-SM Furia reconnaissance drone was shot down.
 Ukrainian Air Force – 4 June 2022: A Ukrainian drone of the 45th Separate Artillery Brigade recorded its own downing by a Russian Tor air defense system. The drone was likely a Spectator-M1 model.
 (2) Ukrainian Air Force – 7 June 2022: A UA Dynamics Punisher drone as well as a WB Electronics Warmate loitering munition operated by Ukrainian forces were shot down in Ukraine.
 Ukrainian Air Force – 10 June 2022: A A1-SM Furia drone was shot down by a Russian Strela-10 air defense system. The interception was recorded on video.
 Ukrainian Air Force – 13 June 2022: A Ukrainian Spectator M1 drone was brought down by Russian Electronic Warfare units; the drone was later retrieved by Russian forces.
 Ukrainian Air Force – 22 June 2022: Two Ukrainian drones launched an attack on a Russian oil refinery in Novoshakhtinsk. One of the drones was destroyed when it struck an oil tank. The footage of the attack showed a drone resembling a commercial Mugin-5 or SkyEye 5000 drone.
 Ukrainian Air Force – 23 June 2022: A Ukrainian A1-SM Furia reconnaissance drone was shot down by Russian forces in Sievierodonetsk.
 Ukrainian Air Force – 29 June 2022: A Ukrainian Tu-141 reconnaissance drone was shot down east of Kursk.
 (2) Ukrainian Air Force – 3 July 2022: Two Ukrainian Tu-143 reconnaissance drones were shot down in the direction of Kursk, head of the Kursk Oblast Roman Starovoyt reported.
 Ukrainian Air Force – 21 July 2022: A Bayraktar TB2 was shot down in Kharkiv Oblast, Ukraine, as it attempted to enter Russian territory; images of the drone wreckage were displayed.
 Ukrainian Naval Aviation – 25 July 2022: The remains of a Ukrainian Bayraktar TB2, tail number T29, were found in Kherson.
 Ukrainian Air Force – 25 July 2022: A Ukrainian Bayraktar TB2 drone with tail number U139 was reported shot down in Belgorod Oblast. Bayraktar TB2 losses reached 12 units, confirmed visually.
 Ukrainian Air Force – 30 July 2022: A Ukrainian A1-SM Furia reconnaissance drone was shot down by Russian forces.
 Ukrainian Air Force – 1 August 2022: A Ukrainian Spectator M1 drone was brought down by Russian forces in the country east.
 Ukrainian Air Force – 9 August 2022: A Ukrainian Bayraktar TB2 drone with call sign 409 was shot down in Ukraine.
 Ukrainian Air Force – 17 August 2022: A downed UAV Factory Penguin reconnaissance vehicle was displayed as an exhibit item at the International Military and Technical Forum ARMY 2022 at Patriot Park in Kubinka, Russia.
 Ukrainian Air Force – 19 August 2022: Ukrainian drones launched an attack on the headquarters of the Black Sea Fleet of the Russian Navy in Sevastopol. A commercial SkyEye 5000 drone was shot down.
 Ukrainian Air Force – 22 August 2022: A Bayraktar Mini UAV was shot down by Russian forces in Ukraine.
 Ukrainian Air Force – 22 August 2022: A Ukrainian ASU-1 Valkyrja reconnaissance UAV was shot down by Russian forces.
 Ukrainian Ground Forces – 30 August 2022: A Leleka-100 reconnaissance drone was shot down by National Guard of Russia forces.
 Ukrainian civilian aircraft – 2 September 2022: An Antonov An-74 aircraft at Kharkiv Aviation Plant was destroyed in a Russian missile strike.
 Ukrainian Air Force – 7 September 2022: Ukrainian officials reported the death of 299th Tactical Aviation Brigade pilot Vadym Blahovisnyi while flying a combat mission on a Su-25.
 Ukrainian Air Force – 2 September 2022: The remains of a Ukrainian Bayraktar TB2 drone were discovered in Kherson.
 Ukrainian Air Force – 11 September 2022: A Ukrainian reconnaissance drone, reportedly A1-SM Furia, was recorded being shot down by Russian air defence in Donetsk region.
 Ukrainian Air Force – 17 September 2022: A Leleka-100 reconnaissance UAV was shot down and captured by Russian forces.
 Ukrainian Air Force – 20 September 2022: A Ukrspecsystems PD-1 multipurpose UAV in transport containers along with the technical documentation was captured by Russian forces, located in a cache in a forest near Kostohryzove in Kherson Oblast.
 Ukrainian Air Force – 25 September 2022: A Ukrainian A1-SM Furia reconnaissance drone was shot down by a Russian 9K33 Osa SAM.
 Ukrainian Ground Forces – 28 September 2022: A photograph of a downed Leleka-100 reconnaissance UAV was posted by the pro-Russian telegram channel DONTSTOPWAR.
 Ukrainian Air Force – 30 September 2022: A Ukrainian unidentified UAV was recorded being shot down by Russian Pantsir-S1 SAMs, in a video published by the Russian Ministry of Defence.
 Ukrainian Air Force – 11 October 2022: A Ukrainian Avia Systems ASU-1 Valkrja was shot down in Luhansk.
 Ukrainian Air Force – 12 October 2022: A video of several Kadyrovtsy showing a downed Malloy Aeronautics T150 cargo drone was posted on the official Telegram account of the Head of the Chechen Republic, Ramzan Kadyrov.ň
 Ukrainian Air Force – 23 October 2022: A Ukrainian Avia Systems ASU-1 Valkrja was downed in Zaporizhia, Ukraine.
 Ukrainian Air Force – 28 October 2022: A Ukrainian Spaitech Sparrow drone was shot down in Ukraine.
 Ukrainian Air Force – 17 November 2022: A Ukrainian reconnaissance UAV was shot down over Kinburn Spit.*
 Ukrainian Air Force – 27 November 2022: A Ukrainian A1-SM Furia reconnaissance drone was shot down.
 Ukrainian Air Force – 29 November 2022: The remains of a Ukrainian Bayraktar TB2 drone were published on social media near Inhulets river, Mykolaiv.
 Ukrainian Air Force – 1 December 2022: A Ukrainian ITEC Skif reconnaissance UAV was forced to land by Russian forces, reportedly using an anti-drone gun.
 Ukrainian Air Force – 12 December 2022: A Ukrainian A1-SM Furia reconnaissance drone was captured by the Russian forces near Lyman, Donbas.
 Ukrainian Ground Forces – 15 December 2022: A Ukrainian Army PGZ-19R Orlik reconnaissance UAV was downed by Russian forces in the vicinity of Kupiansk.
 Ukrainian Air Force – 17 December 2022: A Ukrainian operated RQ-20 Puma drone was captured by Russian forces.
 Ukrainian Air Force – 24 December 2022: A Ukrainian Tu-141 drone was shot down near Voronezh, Russia.
 Ukrainian Air Force – 5 January 2023: A Ukrainian A1-SM Furia reconnaissance drone was downed and captured by the Russian forces
 Ukrainian Air Force – 5 January 2023: A Ukrspecsystems Shark UAV crashed in the vicinity of Aksay, Rostov Oblast in southern Russia, which is approximately 200km away from the frontline.
 Ukrainian Ground Forces – 9 January 2023: A Polish made WB Electronics FlyEye was captured by Russian Forces.
 Ukrainian Ground Forces – 17 January 2023: A repurposed EFT E616 agricultural drone was captured by Russian Forces. The UAV has 6 motors, 4 grenades, a night vision camera and he runs on petrol.
 Ukrainian Ground Forces – 18 January 2023: On 18 January 2023, the Russian group "Co-ordinational Centre for the assistance of Novorossiya" posted photos of a captured Ukrainian reconnaissance drone. Upon dissasembly, the group stated that a Starlink antenna was found attached to the device, along with a Raspberry Pi computer and a CubePilot module. With an integrated Starlink dish, the drone would have had internet access anywhere it could see open sky. That would allow it to be controlled from anywhere in the world with a satellite connection. 
 (2) Ukrainian Air Force – 19 January 2023: The remains of two SkyEye 5000 (Mugin-5) drones were discovered by Russian forces in Luhansk Oblast. These simple commercial Chinese origin aircraft are often used by Ukrainian forces as improvised suicide drones.
 Ukrainian Air Force – 22 January 2023: A Ukrainian Bayraktar TB2 crashed under unknown circumstances.
 Ukrainian Ground Forces – 31 January 2023: Photographs of a Leleka-100 reconnaissance UAV with serial number 525 were posted by Russian forces. The photographs were posted on 31 January 2023 but may have been downed at an earlier date.
 Ukrainian Ground Forces – 31 January 2023: A Baykar Bayraktar Mini UAV was downed by Russian forces, as shown in a photo published by Russian forces.
 Ukrainian Ground Forces – 31 January 2023: An Athlon-Avia A1-CM Furia with serial number ACM13072, code 610, reconnaissance UAV was downed by Russian forces near Kreminna.
 Ukrainian Ground Forces – 31 January 2023: An Athlon-Avia A1-CM Furia downed using electronic warfare equipment was photographed on social media.
 Ukrainian Ground Forces – 3 February 2023: A Mara-2M reconnaissance UAV with serial number 1766 was downed by Russian forces.
 Ukrainian Air Force – 5 February 2023: A Ukrainian Tu-141 drone carrying a OFAB-100-120 bomb crashed near Kaluga, Kaluga Oblast.
 Ukrainian Ground Forces – 23 February 2023: A Ukrainian Bayraktar TB2 crashed in Kharkiv Oblast due to a friendly fire incident.
 (2) Ukrainian Ground Forces – 18 February 2023: A downed Ukrainian Aviation Systems Hawk reconnaissance UAV, as well as the wreckage of an Athlon-Avia A1-CM Furia, were posted on social media. Of note is the open source controller used to operate the drone showcased in the pictures.
 Ukrainian Ground Forces – 18 February 2023: A Ukrainian Athlon-Avia A1-CM Furia with registration number ACM13009 downed by mobilised troops was photographed on social media.
 (2) Ukrainian Ground Forces – 27 February 2023: Two Ukrainian T10 Dovbush UAVs loaded with PE8 explosives were shot down in Belgorod Oblast.
 Ukrainian Air Force – 28 February 2023: The remains of a Israeli-made Aerostar UAV was found after attack on a Rosneft oil rafinery in Tuapse.
 Ukrainian Air Force – 28 February 2023: A Ukrainian Tu-141 drone armed with explosives crashed near village of Novyi, Giaginsky District.
 (2) Ukrainian Air Force – 28 February 2023: At least two commercial Chinese-made Mugin-5 Pro UAVs were shot down over Crimea.
 Ukrainian Air Force – 28 February 2023: A Ukrainian UJ-22 Airborne crashed near gas compressor facility in Kolomensky District, Moscow Oblast.

Civilian aircraft

Russian aircraft losses

Fixed-wing aircraft

Rotary-wing aircraft
 (3) Russian Air Force – 24–28 February 2022: Video footage from the Kyiv Reservoir showed two Russian helicopters targeted by Ukrainian MANPADS, a Mi-24/35 that was shot down and fell into the water, and another helicopter that survived enemy fire. On 4 June, Ukrainian forces retrieved the remains of the lost Mi-35M helicopter, call sign Blue 29, from the Kyiv Reservoir. The bodies of two crewmembers were retrieved as well. Two Russian Ka-52 attack helicopters were damaged by MANPADS fire during the Battle of Antonov Airport. The first one landed safely near the airport, and was later willingly destroyed by Russian Armed Forces. The second one was discovered abandoned on 2 March near Babyntsi in Bucha Raion. It was later stripped of valuable parts and destroyed on the ground by Russian forces. During the first day of the war, two Ka-52 and one Mi-24/35 helicopters were destroyed.
 Russian Air Force – 26 February 2022: A Russian Mi-35 was shot down in Sahy, Kherson region. Images of the shot down and the aircraft wreck are published.
 Russian Air Force – 1 March 2022: Ukrainian forces shot down a Russian Mi-35M helicopter, call sign Red 04, registration number RF-95290 with MANPADS, in the Kyiv Reservoir; the helicopter was later retrieved by Ukrainian engineers in Vyshgorod on 5 May 2022.
 (2) Russian Air Force – 4 March 2022: One Mi-8 helicopter was shot down near Volnovakha as it approached the Su-25 previously downed. Another Mi-8 helicopter with registration number RF- 91292 was shot down near Makarov, Kyiv Oblast, and later identified by Ukrainian forces; the crew died in the crash.
 (2) Russian Air Force – 5 March 2022: Two Mil Mi-8 helicopters with registration numbers RF-91165 and RF-91164 were destroyed near Mykolaiv.
 (2) Russian Air Force – 5 March 2022: One Mi-24 with registration number RF-95286 was shot down and recorded in video by drone feed. A Mi-35, registration number RF-13017, was shot down in Bashtanka Raion of Mykolaiv Oblast. Images of the helicopter wreck were recorded and displayed on social networks.
 Russian Air Force – 6 March 2022: One Mi-24P with registration number RF-94966 was shot down by Ukrainian MANPADS in Kyiv Oblast.
 Russian Air Force – 11 March 2022: A Russian Forpost drone was shot down in Zhytomyr, local media reported.
 (2) Russian Air Force – 11–13 March 2022: Ukrainian forces seize two Russian  drones.
 Russian Air Force – 12 March 2022: A Ka-52 helicopter with registration number RF-13409 was shot down near Kherson; one of the occupants sustained serious injuries.
 Russian Air Force – 16 March 2022: A destroyed Russian Ka-52 was found in Mykolaiv region with registration number RF-13411.
 Russian Air Force – 17 March 2022: A Russian Mi-35M was reported destroyed by the Ukrainian Ministry of Defense, unknown location.
 Russian Air Force – 30 March 2022: A Russian Mil Mi-8 with registration number RF-91882 was destroyed in the ground in Kharkiv Oblast.
 Russian Air Force – 1 April 2022: A pair of Russian helicopters were filmed in Luhansk Oblast; one Mil Mi-28N was shot down by fire from a MANPADS. Both the pilot and the gunner survived. According to The Times, Ukrainian forces used a UK-made Starstreak system to shoot down the helicopter.
 Russian Air Force – 2 April 2022: The remains of a Russian Mi-8 helicopter were discovered in Hostomel Airport. The craft, with registration number RF-91285, was possibly lost during the fight for the airport in February.
 Russian Air Force – 4 April 2022: A Russian Mil Mi-8 helicopter with registration number RF-04812 was reported destroyed in Ukraine; the pilot died.
 Russian Air Force – 5 April 2022: A Russian Ka-52 hovering at a very low altitude was shot down by a Stugna-P anti-tank guided missile.
 (2) Russian Air Force – 21 April 2022: A Russian Mi-8 and a Mi-28 attack helicopter were shot down by Ukrainian forces using 9K38 Igla MANPADS in Zaporizhzhia Oblast.
 Russian Air Force – 15 April 2022: A Russian Ka-52 was shot down by Ukrainian forces in Kharkiv Oblast at night; it was reported 2 crewmembers died.
 Russian Air Force – 26 April 2022: A Mil Mi-28 wreck was found by Ukrainian forces outside the town of Hostomel in Kyiv region. The craft was likely destroyed during the battle for Hostomel airport in February.
 Russian Air Force – 30 April 2022: A Russian Ka-52 helicopter was shot down by a Stugna-P anti-tank guided missile.
 Russian Air Force – 7 May 2022: A Russian Mil Mi-8, codename Blue 98, was destroyed in the ground by Ukrainian Su-27s near Snake Island.
 Russian Air Force – 9 May 2022: A Mi-28 was destroyed in northern Kharkiv Oblast; the attack helicopter, with registration number RF-13654, was the third visually reported loss of that type.
 Russian Air Force – 14 May 2022: The remains of a Ka-52, call sign Yellow 22, were found destroyed near the town of Hostomel, likely destroyed during the Battle of Hostomel Airport in February.
 Russian Air Force – 16 May 2022: A Mi-28N with registration number RF-13628 was destroyed in Kharkiv.
 Russian Air Force – 19 May 2022: A Ka-52 was recorded being burned in Ukraine.
 Russian Air Force – 4 June 2022: Ukrainian forces of the 128th Mountain Brigade reported the downing of a Russian Ka-52 in the north. According to Ukrainian officials, the helicopter was shot down by MANPADS.
 Russian Air Force – 12 June 2022: A Mi-28H was destroyed and its wreck recorded in video by Ukrainian troops; the crew of the aircraft died at the crash site.
 Russian Air Force – 16 June 2022: A Russian Mi-35M was shot down by the Ukrainian 231st Dnipropetrovsk Territorial Defense Battalion using MANPADS and recorded on video.
 Russian Air Force – 27 June 2022: Ukrainian soldiers used a British made Martlet MANPADS to hit and damage a Russian Ka-52 helicopter, forcing it to land.
 Russian Air Force – 28 June 2022: An unknown helicopter (likely a Mi-8 or Ka-52), operated by the 6th Air Force and Air Defense Army, was shot down. All seven occupants, including Lieutenant Maxim Kozlov and Lieutenant Alexey Usov, were killed. Maxim Kozlov posthumously received the Order of Courage for the prompt restoration of a damaged Ka-52 helicopter in combat conditions.
 Russian Air Force – 15 August 2022: Ukrainian forces damaged a Russian Ka-52 helicopter flying in Donetsk Oblast.
 Russian Air Force – 17 September 2022: A Russian Kamov Ka-52 helicopter was shot down in Velika Novosilka, Donetsk Oblast.
 Russian Air Force – 22 September 2022: A Ka-52 attack helicopter was shot down in Zaporizhzhia Oblast by an anti-air missile. The pilots survived.
 (2) Russian Air Force – 1 October 2022: Two Russian Ka-52s attack helicopter were shot down in Zaporizhzhia Oblast by an anti-air missiles. One pilot ejected.
 Russian Air Force – 8 October 2022: The remains of a Ka-52 attack helicopter were found by Ukrainian forces of the 128th Mountain Brigade in Kherson Oblast. The date of loss and circumstances were unknown.
 Russian Air Force – 20 October 2022: The remains of a Ka-52 attack helicopter, probably downed in the summer, were found in Ukraine. Both crew members, Major Maxim Kovalev and Senior Lieutenant Andrei Butorin, were killed.
 Russian Air Force – 30 October 2022: The remains of a Mil Mi-24 attack helicopter were found in Kharkiv, Ukraine.
 (2) Russian Air Force – 31 October 2022: Two Russian Ka-52s were confirmed damaged by Russian officials at Pskov Airport near the Latvian border, likely by Ukrainian saboteurs.
 Russian Air Force – 31 October 2022: One Russian Mil Mi-8MTKO, call sign Yellow 72, operated by Wagner Group was shot down with MANPADS by Ukrainian forces near Spirne, Donetsk Oblast; the loss was recorded in video.
 Russian Air Force – 18 November 2022: The remains of a Ka-52 attack helicopter were found in Kherson, Ukraine.
 Russian Air Force – 4 December 2022: A Ka-52 was shot down by the Ukrainian Dnieper anti-aircraft missile brigade, killing both pilots.
 Russian Air Force – 20 December 2022: A Ka-52, codename Yellow 23, was shot down reportedly by a Pantsir-S1 in a friendly fire incident in Zaporizhzhia Oblast. The pilots likely survived.
 Russian Ground Forces – 9 February 2023: A Russian Mi-35M was damaged and subsequently destroyed in the ground by Ukrainian forces.
 Russian Air Force – 6 March 2023: The wreckage of a Russian Ka-52 was found by Russian soldiers in the area of Vuhledar, Donetsk Oblast.
 Russian Air Force – 16 March 2023: A Russian Ka-52 crashed in Orikhiv Raion, Zaporizhzhia Oblast. At least one crew member died.

Unmanned aerial vehicles
 Russian Ground Forces – 5 March 2022: One Orlan-10 drone was shot down in Ukraine.
 Russian Ground Forces – 14 March 2022: A Russian Orlan-10 crashed in Romania.
 Russian Ground Forces – 21 March 2022: A Russian Orlan-10 is shot down by Ukrainian forces in Kharkiv.
 Russian Ground Forces – 28 March 2022: A Russian Orlan-10 is shot down by Ukrainian Army Transcarpathian brigades.
 Russian Ground Forces – 2 April 2022: A Russian Orlan-10 is shot down by Ukrainian forces in Poltava.
 Russian Ground Forces – 5 April 2022: A Russian Orlan-10 was shot down in Kramatorsk, Donetsk Oblast. The Ukrainian Ministry of Defense released images of the drone wreck.
 Russian Ground Forces – 7 April 2022: A Russian Orlan-10 was forced to crash land in Lugansk by Electronic Warfare units of the Ukrainian 24th Separate Mechanic Brigade. The Ukrainian Ministry of Defense released images of the drone wreck.
 Russian Air Force – 7 April 2022: A Russian Orion drone was reported destroyed in Ukraine. The Ukrainian MOD released images of the drone wreck.
 Russian Ground Forces – 8 April 2022: A Russian Orlan-30, a modified version of Orlan-10, was reported shot down by Ukrainian forces. Units of the 25th Mechanized brigade destroyed the drone near Lugansk.
 Russian Ground Forces – 11 April 2022: A Russian Orlan-10 was downed by Ukrainian paratroopers in southern Ukraine.
 (2) Russian Ground Forces – 14 April 2022: Two Russian Orlan-10 were reported lost by Ukrainian forces.
 Russian Ground Forces – 17 April 2022: A Russian Orlan-10 was shot down by Ukrainian paratroopers using a MANPADS.
 Russian Air Force – 19 April 2022: Ukrainian forces found one crashed Russian .
 Russian Ground Forces – 21 April 2022: A Russian Orlan-10 was shot down by Ukrainian troops using a MANPADS.
 Russian Ground Forces – 22 April 2022: A Russian Orlan-10 was shot down by Ukrainian troops.
 (2) Russian Ground Forces – 23 April 2022: A Russian Orlan-10 was brought down by Electronic Warfare units of the 59th Motorized Infantry Brigade, while another was recovered by the National Guard after it crashed.
 Russian Ground Forces – 26 April 2022: A Russian Orlan-10 was shot down over Ukraine.
 Ministry of Emergency Situations – 30 April 2022: A Russian Orlan-10 crashed in Donetsk Oblast.
 Russian Ground Forces – 2 May 2022: A Russian Orlan-10 was shot down by Ukrainian Army Transcarpathian brigades.
 Russian Air Force – 3 May 2022: A ZALA Aero  drone was shot down in Ukraine.
 Russian Ground Forces – 3 May 2022: A Russian Orlan-10 was shot down by the Ukrainian forces in Dnipropetrovsk Oblast.
 (2) Russian Ground Forces  – 4 May 2022: Two Russian Orlan-10 were shot down over Ukraine.
 Russian Air Force – 10 May 2022: A ZALA Aero  drone was shot down in Ukraine.
 Russian Ground Forces – 10 May 2022: A Russian Orlan-10 was shot down remotely by the Ukrainian forces without damage in Zaporizhzhia Oblast.
 (2) Russian Ground Forces – 11 May 2022: Two Russian Orlan-10 were brought down across Ukraine.
 Russian Ground Forces  – 13 May 2022: A Russian Orlan-10 was brought down by electronic warfare units of the 79th Air Assault Brigade in Mykolaiv.
 Russian Air Force – 23 May 2022: A ZALA Aero  drone was shot down in Ukraine.
 (2) Russian Ground Forces – 25–28 May 2022: Two Orlan-10 were shot down in Ukraine, one in Kherson Oblast and in Dnipro Oblast.
 Russian Ground Forces – 8 June 2022: A Russian Orlan-10 was brought down by Ukrainian forces.
 Russian Air Force – 10 June 2022: A Russian Su-25 was recorded damaged by enemy fire; the aircraft managed to return to its base for repairs.
 Russian Ground Forces – 13 June 2022: A Russian modified Orlan-10 drone was shot down in Ukraine; according to Ukrainian sources the drone was a cartographic model with several cameras designed for additional surveillance.
 Russian Air Force – 15 June 2022: A Russian Merlin VR drone was shot down in Ukraine.
 Ministry of Emergency Situations – 17 June 2022: A Russian Ministry of Emergency Situations Supercam S450 drone crashed in Ukraine and was seized by Ukrainian officials.
 Russian Air Force – 20 July 2022: A Russian Latochka UAV was brought down and captured by Ukrainian forces.
 Russian Air Force – 21 July 2022: The remains of a Russian Orion drone were found in Ukraine.
 Russian Air Force – 23 July 2022: A ZALA Aero  UAV was shot down in near Izyum, Kharkiv Oblast.
 Russian Ground Forces – 28 July 2022: A Russian Orlan-10 was shot down by Ukrainian soldiers using a FIM-92 Stinger missile.
 Russian Air Force – 30 July 2022: The remains of a Russian Forpost drone, registration number 932, were recorded in Bulgaria.
 Russian Ground Forces – 31 July 2022: A Russian cartographic modified Orlan-10 UAV was shot down by Ukrainian Buk SAMs.
 Russian Ground Forces – 5 August 2022: A Russian Orlan-10 UAV was downed.
 Russian Air Force – 8 August 2022: A ZALA Aero  UAV was shot down in southern Ukraine.
 (2) Russian Ground Forces  – 13 August 2022: Two Russian Orlan-10 were reported shot down by Ukrainian forces using a British-made Stormer HVM system.
 Russian Air Force – 16 August 2022: A Russian  drone crashed in Ukraine and was seized by Ukrainian forces.
 Russian Ground Forces – 19 August 2022: A Russian Orlan-10 UAV was downed by Ukrainian forceson the Southern front.
 Russian Ground Forces – 20 August 2022: A Russian cartographic modified Orlan-10 UAV was shot down and destroyed by Ukrainian forces on the Eastern front.
 Russian Air Force – 21 August 2022: A Russian  reconnaissance and surveillance UAV was downed by Ukrainian forces in an undisclosed place.
 Russian Ground Forces – 21 August 2022: A Russian Orlan-10 UAV was downed likely by Ukrainian electronic warfare system on the Eastern front.
 Russian Ground Forces – 23 August 2022: A Russian Orlan-10 UAV was downed in Zaporizhzhia Oblast likely by Ukrainian electronic warfare system.
 Russian Ground Forces – 25 August 2022: An Orlan-10 was downed by Ukrainian paratroopers, allegedly through electronic warfare systems.
 Russian Ground Forces – 28 August 2022: A Russian Orlan-10 UAV was shot down by the Ukrainian forces in an undisclosed place.
 Russian Ground Forces – 2 September 2022: A Russian cartographic modified Orlan-10 UAV was shot down by Ukrainian forces.
 Russian Air Force – 2 September 2022: A ZALA Aero  UAV was downed without apparent damage by the Ukrainian forces on the Eastern front.
 Russian Ground Forces – 19 September 2022: A Russian cartographic modified Orlan-10 UAV was downed by in Mykolaiv Oblast.
 Russian Air Force – 23 September 2022: An Iranian made Mohajer 6, presumably operated by Russian forces, was brought down by Ukrainian forces in the Black Sea near Odessa.
 (2) Russian Ground Forces – 23 September 2022: A Russian Orlan-10 and an Orlan-30 were forced to land by the Ukrainian Air Assault forces on the Southern front using electronic warfare systems.
 Russian Ground Forces – 28 September 2022: A Russian Orlan-10 UAV was downed by Ukrainian forces. The location is unknown.
 Russian Ground Forces – 29 September 2022: A Russian Orlan-10 UAV was shot down by Ukrainian forces in Sumy Oblast.
 Russian Air Force – 30 September 2022: A ZALA Aero  UAV was downed without apparent damage by the Ukrainian forces near Hoptivka, Kharkiv Oblast.
 Russian Ground Forces – 19 October 2022: A Russian Orlan-10 was captured by Ukrainian forces.
 Russian Air Force – 2 November 2022: A Russian  was shot down by the Ukrainian army on the Southern front.
 Russian Ground Forces - 3 October 2022: Ukrainian forces captured one Russian 
 Russian Air Force – 8 November 2022: A Russian  drone was shot down and captured by Ukrainian forces in Kharkiv.
 Russian Ground Forces – 8 November 2022: A Russian Orlan-10 UAV fell to the ground and was captured by the Ukrainian 28th Mechanized Brigade.
 Russian Air Force – 9 November 2022: A Russian Supercam S350 drone was shot down near Sumy Oblast.
 Russian Air Force – 9 November 2022: A Russian Korsar drone was recorded crashed in Ukraine.
 Russian Ground Forces – 9 November 2022: A Russian Orlan-10 UAV was shot down by Ukrainian forces in Donetsk Oblast.
 Russian Air Force – 26 November 2022: A ZALA Aero  UAV was shot down near Bakhmut.
 Russian Ground Forces – 29 November 2022: A Russian Orlan-10 UAV was captured by Ukrainian forces. The location and date are unknown. This drone was assembled from several different examples.
 Russian Ground Forces – 29 November 2022: A Russian Orlan-10 UAV was downed by Ukrainian forces. The location is unknown.
 Russian Ground Forces – 1 December 2022: A Russian Orlan-10 UAV was destroyed by Ukrainian forces, reportedly near Bakhmut.
 Russian Ground Forces – 4 December 2022: A Russian Orlan-10 UAV was downed by Ukrainian forces. The location is unknown.
 Russian Ground Forces – 30 December 2022: A Russian Orlan-10 UAV was downed by Ukrainian forces. The location is reportedly on the Eastern front.
 Russian Ground Forces – 4 January 2023: A Russian Orlan-10 UAV was downed by Ukrainian electronic warfare system. The drone was unusually adapted for targeting ground targets and carries 4x OFSP HE-FRAG bomblets in special underwing pods.
 Russian Ground Forces – 11 January 2023: A Russian Orlan-10 UAV was captured by Ukrainian forces on the Eastern front. The photo was first posted on 11 January 2023.
 Russian Air Force – 11 January 2023: A Russian Forpost hit electric power lines and crashed near Severny, Belgorod Oblast.
 Russian Ground Forces – 20 January 2023: A Russian Orlan-10 UAV was downed by Ukrainian forces.
 Russian Ground Forces – 3 February 2023: A ZALA 421-16 was downed by Ukrainian forces in the vicinity of Donetsk. 
 (2) Russian Ground Forces – 3 February 2023: An Orlan-10 and an Orlan-30 were downed by Ukrainian forces in Donetsk Oblast.
 Russian Air Force – 5 February 2023: The remains of a Russian  reconnaissance UAV were found by Ukrainian forces in Rivne Oblast. The photo was first posted on 5 February 2023.
 Russian Ground Forces – 10 March 2023: A Russian Orlan-10 UAV was captured by Ukrainian forces.

Other operator losses
  Hungarian civilian aircraft – 27 February 2022: A Cessna 152 with registration HA-WAS, stored in the Antonov An-225 hangar at Hostomel Airport, was crushed by the left wing of the destroyed Antonov An-225.
  (3) Azerbaijan Air Force – 28 February 2022: Three MiG-29s being refitted in the Lviv State Aircraft Plant were reported destroyed or damaged on the ground by Russian strikes.
 (2) Romanian Air Force – 2 March 2022: One MiG-21 LanceR was lost while on an air patrol inside Romanian airspace near Cogealac, 60 miles from the Ukrainian border. This "occurred amid increased air police missions in Romania after the Russian invasion of Ukraine." An IAR 330 on a search and rescue mission for the missing MiG-21 crashed with seven fatalities. The eight servicemen who died in the two accidents were posthumously promoted and decorated by the president of Romania.
 Belarusian Air Force – 11 July 2022: Ukrainian forces shot down a Belarusian Chekan loitering munition.
 United States Air Force – 14 March 2023: A US MQ-9 Reaper UCAV was lost over the Black Sea after it was intercepted by two Russian Su-27s, one of which intentionally collided with the drone and damaged its propeller.

Total losses 
The following table is made from the data reported in the article.

See also
 List of Russo-Ukrainian conflict military equipment
 List of ship losses during the Russo-Ukrainian War
 Malaysia Airlines Flight 17
 
 Russian Air Force Aircraft

References

Military equipment of the Russo-Ukrainian War
Ukrainian military aircraft
War in Donbas
aircraft losses
Aviation history of Ukraine
Military history of Ukraine
Ukrainian Air Force
Military equipment of the 2022 Russian invasion of Ukraine
Russo-Ukrainian War